Metallostichodes nigrocyanella is a species of snout moth. It is found in France, Spain, Portugal, Italy, Croatia, Greece and on Cyprus, as well as in Turkey.

The wingspan is about 13 mm.

References

Moths described in 1865
Phycitini
Moths of Europe
Moths of Asia